Nucella squamosa, common name the scaly dogwhelk, is a species of sea snail, a marine gastropod mollusk in the family Muricidae, the murex snails or rock snails.

Description
The scaly dogwhelk is a small brown whelk with many fine knobbly spiral ridges on its shell. It grows up to 5 cm in total length. The ridges of the snail's shell are not often visible because the whelk is usually overgrown by the high-spined commensal hydroid, Hydtractinia altispina, which looks prickly and is orange.

Distribution
This marine snail is found off the southern African coast from central Namibia to Port St Johns, subtidally to 50m under water.

Ecology
The eggs are laid in small groups of capsules which resemble stalked clubs. The commensal hydroid deters several of the snail's predators.

References

External links

Muricidae
Gastropods described in 1816